The Roman Catholic Diocese of Petare is a diocese located in the city of Petare in the Ecclesiastical province of Caracas in Venezuela.

The diocese covers an area of the civil department of the municipality of Sucre, Miranda, and is made up of five civil parishes hitherto belonging to the metropolitan archdiocese of Caracas. It's divided into 23 parishes, having 57 priests and 5 seminarians all together as per 2021.

History
On 16 November 2021, Pope Francis established the Diocese of Petare, when it was split off from the Roman Catholic Archdiocese of Caracas.

Ordinaries
Juan Carlos Bravo Salazar (since 16 November 2021)

See also
Roman Catholicism in Venezuela

References

External links
 Profile at the Catholic Hierarchy

Roman Catholic dioceses in Venezuela
Roman Catholic Ecclesiastical Province of Caracas, Santiago de Venezuela
Christian organizations established in 2021
Roman Catholic dioceses and prelatures established in the 21st century
2021 establishments in Venezuela